

The Luft-Limousine or Luftlimousine, also known as Etrich VIII Luft-Limousine, was a single engine monoplane built by the Etrich company in Silesia in 1912.

Development
The Luft-Limousine was designed by Igo Etrich, the builder of the Etrich Taube.

The plane was built in the 'Etrich Fliegerwerke' factory in Liebau (today Lubawka, Poland). It was an aircraft with a cabin for one pilot and a single passenger that was enclosed with wire gauze and celluloid windows, the reason for which Igo Etrich named it Luft-Limousine.
The Luft-Limousine was the first military monoplane with an enclosed cabin. It was powered by a 60 hp Austro-Daimler engine.

Operational history
The maiden flight of this plane took place in Josefstadt, only few kilometres south of Trautenau on 7 May 1912.
During World War I the Luft-Limousine was used by the Austro-Hungarian army.

Operators

Austro-Hungarian Imperial and Royal Aviation Troops

Specifications

See also

References

External links
 Early Birds 1912
 Aviation in 1913: Images from Scientific American's Archives (Slide Show)
Austrian Philately; 90 years of Aviation - Etrich Luft-Limousine stamp 
Combatace.com The Museum of Diseased Imaginings

1910s Austro-Hungarian military reconnaissance aircraft
Shoulder-wing aircraft
Single-engined tractor aircraft
Aircraft first flown in 1912